Vicaria, often known as Il Vasto, is one of the 30 quartieri of Naples, southern Italy, lying immediately to the east of the historical city centre (Centro storico). 

It borders the districts of Poggioreale, Zona Industriale and San Lorenzo, which together with Vicaria make up the 4th municipality of the city. It also borders the district of San Carlo all'Arena, in the 3rd municipality.

Vicaria comprises a relatively small area, 0.72 km2. It had a population in 2009 of 16,369 inhabitants.

It takes its name from the eastern section of the Via dei Tribunali (the "street of the courthouses"), in the neighbourhood of San Lorenzo, once known as the "Via della Vicaria", since the Vicaria (the still-prominent Palazzo Ricca at the east end of the street) housed the main tribunal under the Spanish viceroys.

References

External links
 Storiacity.it: Zona Vicaria Vecchia 
 Napolipiu.com: Come nasce il detto o trummetto a Vicaria 
 Napolitoday.it: Pare a trummetta a Vicaria 
 Storienapoli.it: Etimologia e storia di tutti i quartieri di Napoli 
 Napoliflash24.it: Immigrazione: Quartiere Vicaria detto il Vasto e Licola, Stato dove sei! 

Quartieri of Naples